Nordic combined at the 2015 Winter Universiade was held in Štrbské Pleso from January 26 to January 31, 2015.

Events

Medal table

External links
Nordic combined results at the 2015 Winter Universiade.
Results book

 
Nordic combined
2015
Universiade
2015 in Nordic combined